Səfikürd is a village in the Goygol Rayon of Azerbaijan.

References 

Populated places in Goygol District